Marquis of Castelo Rodrigo was a title of Portuguese nobility created by Philip II of Portugal on January 29, 1600 for Dom Cristóvão de Moura, 1st Count of Castelo Rodrigo. The Moura family claimed its origin from the re-conquest of Moura (Alentejo, Portugal) from the Moors, during the Reconquista in 1165.

Cristóvão de Moura was born in Lisbon 1538. As a Portuguese national, he supported the House of Habsburg during the Portuguese succession crisis of 1580. Moura was rewarded for his service with the title Count of Castelo Rodrigo by Philip I of Portugal. His son Philip II advanced him to Marquis in 1600.

The newly created Marquis was appointed Viceroy of Portugal, controlling Portugal from January 29, 1600 to 1603, again in 1603, and again from February 1608 to 1612. His tenure of the office was not well received by the Portuguese and the high taxes he implemented were strongly resented. The 1st Marquis married Margarita de Corte Real, an heiress who brought the titles and wealth of the Corte-Real family, including governorship of some of the Azores Islands. As a result of this union the two family names were combined to become Moura e Corte-Real.

The couple built a large palace in Lisbon next to the Royal Palace, 50 metres square with wings extending down to the river Tagus, it became the most celebrated private palace in Lisbon. The first Marquis died in Madrid in 1613.

Following the overthrow of the House of Habsburg, by the House of Braganza, in 1640, the family were accused of collaboration and their estates forfeited to the Portuguese crown. These included a hunting estate at Queluz near Lisbon on which now stands the former royal palace Queluz National Palace.

The Marquesate has been held by: 
Dom Cristóvão de Moura, 1st Count and then first Marquess of Castelo Rodrigo.
Manuel de Moura, 2nd Marquis of Castelo Rodrigo; (1590–1651). From 1644 to 1647 Governor of the Habsburg Netherlands. Married Leonor de Melo (1594–1641) the daughter Nuno Álvares de Melo, III Marquis de Ferreira.
Francisco de Moura, 3rd Marquis of Castelo Rodrigo (1610–1675) was a Spanish political figure. He was created 1stDuke of Nochera in 1656. He served as Viceroy of Sardinia between 1657 and 1661, and Governor of the Habsburg Netherlands between 1664 and 1668. He married Ana Maria de Aragon, daughter of António de Aragon y Moncada, VI Duke Montalto, and Juana de la Cerda, daughter of the Duke of Medinaceli.
Dona Leonor de Moura Côrte-Real, 4th Marchioness de Castelo Rodrigo born circa 1630 was the daughter and heiress of the 3rd Marquess. She married twice firstly Ángel de Guzmán the son of the Duke of Medina-Torres and secondly to Pedro Homodei y Pacheco, 2nd Marquess of Almonacid de los Oteros. The first of these marriages was childless, and she had a son from her second marriage,
Dona Joana de Moura Côrte-Real, 5th Marchioness of Castelo Rodrigo was the sister of Dona Leonor and daughter of the 3rd Marquess. She married Gilberto Pius, Prince of San Gregorio. The couple had four children the eldest of whom born in 1672 succeeded his mother as 6th Marquess.
Don Francisco Pio, 6th Marquess of Castelo Rodrigo. Born in 1672 he married Joana Spinola de Lacerda and had three children. The title then passed to his daughter born in 1719 rather than to his son Gisberto Pius of Savoy and Spinola, Marquess of Almonacid de los Oteros.
Dona Pia Isabella Maria, 7th, Marchioness of Castel Rodrigo was born in Madrid in 1719. She married twice firstly to Manuel Lopez de Ayala y Fernandez de Velasco, 12th Count of Fuensalida and secondly to Antonio José Valcarcel y Pérez Pastor.
Antonio Valcárcel y Pío de Saboya, 9th Marquess of Castelo Rodrigo was the son of the above by her second husband. He was born in Alicante in 1748 and died in 1808. He married Maia Tomasa Pasqual del Pobil.

Notes

References
Cristóvão de Moura Published by Castelo, Distrito de Setúbal, Portugal. Retrieved December 19, 2007.
Connors, Joseph. Borromini and the Marchese di Castel Rodrigo. The Burlington Magazine, Vol. 133, No. 1060 (Jul., 1991), pp. 434–440.

Moura genealogy Retrieved December 19, 2007.

Castelo Rodrigo
Figueira de Castelo Rodrigo
Marquisates